Esmaiel Jabbari is a full professor of chemical engineering at the University of South Carolina.

Education
Jabbari obtained his B.S. in chemical engineering from Virginia Tech in 1982 and then got his master's degree in chemistry and chemical engineering from the same place in 1986 and 1989 respectively. He then continued his education at Purdue University, where, after spending five years under the supervision from Nicholas A. Peppas, he received his Ph.D. in chemical engineering.

Career
From 1993 to 1994 Jabbari was a postdoctoral research fellow at Monsanto Biotechnical Group and then became an adjunct professor of chemical engineering at the Washington University. Until September 2001, Esmaiel Jabbari worked as an associate professor at Tehran Polytechnic (now Amirkabir University of Technology). From September 2001 to July 2002 he was a visiting scholar at Rice University and following it, served as senior research associate at the Mayo Clinic. Since 2015 Jabbari works as full professor of chemical and biomedical engineering, after propelling to it from tenured and adjunct-associate in 2004, 2007 and 2009 respectively. During those times, he also was a visiting professor at Tohoku University in Tōhoku Region, Japan, and at Brigham and Women's Hospital.

He serves as academic editor of PLOS One. He also serves as North American editor of the Journal of Biomaterials and Tissue Engineering and on the editorial board of International Journal of Biomaterials and the International Journal of Biomedical Nanoscience and Nanotechnology.

Awards and honors
Omega Rho (1988)
Sigma Xi (1988)
Phi Lambda Upsilon (1989)
Outstanding College Students of America (1989)
Member of the New York Academy of Sciences (1993)
Tau Beta Pi (2006)
Berton Rahn Prize Award, AO Foundation (2012)
Elected Fellow of the College of Fellows of the AIMBE (2013)

References

External links
Jabbari's Chemical Engineering webpage
Jabbari's research group
Jabbari's Biomedical Engineering webpage
Jabbari's AIMBE webpage

Handbook of Biomimetics and Bioinspiration edited by Jabbari et al.

1961 births
Living people
Virginia Tech alumni
Purdue University College of Agriculture alumni
American bioengineers
Rice University faculty
Mayo Clinic people
University of South Carolina faculty
Academic staff of Tohoku University
Iranian emigrants to the United States
Fellows of the American Institute for Medical and Biological Engineering